"The Other Side" is a song by American singers SZA and Justin Timberlake. It was released on February 26, 2020, as the lead single from the Trolls World Tour companion soundtrack, Trolls World Tour (Original Motion Picture Soundtrack). Timberlake voices the character "Branch" in the film. The song was written by SZA, Timberlake, Ludwig Göransson, Max Martin, Frank Iero and Sarah Aarons, while production was handled by Timberlake and Göransson.

Background and promotion
In February 2017, it was confirmed that Timberlake would be voicing the character Branch once again for a continuation of the Trolls series. On August 19, 2019, SZA stated in an interview with Kerwin Frost that she had recently hit the studio with Timberlake. Timberlake confirmed the collaboration in October 2019, although not yet disclosing any details on what project it was intended for. On January 20, 2020, SZA took to her social media to post pictures of her in different costumes and settings, which would later turn out to be part of the video shoot. About the collaboration with Timberlake, the singer explained that she was "thrilled to be invited to participate in this project with Justin". On February 21, 2020, Timberlake posted a short video of himself talking about the song and providing the release date on Instagram.

Composition
Amanda Gordon of Vulture described the song as "a deeply infectious, groovy song peppered with the kinds of handclaps and funky keyboard riffs designed to make you move". Furthermore, Jack Giroux of Grit, described the song as "a joyful slice of poppy funkiness".

Music video
The music video was released on February 26, 2020 and shows the artists dancing and grooving around in different settings. Critics drew comparisons to "Hype Williams' 1990s fish-eye-lensed clips for Missy Elliott, Diddy, Mase and others".

Charts

Weekly charts

Year-end charts

Certifications

Release history

References

2020 singles
2020 songs
SZA songs
Justin Timberlake songs
Songs written by SZA
Songs written by Justin Timberlake
Songs written by Max Martin
Songs written by Ludwig Göransson
Songs written by Sarah Aarons
Song recordings produced by Justin Timberlake
Song recordings produced by Max Martin
Songs written for animated films
RCA Records singles
Trolls (franchise)
American disco songs